Denzel Budde (born 8 April 1997) is a Dutch footballer who plays as a right back for Unicum in the Tweede Klasse.

Professional career
Budde was in the youth academy of  PEC Zwolle for 10 years. Budde signed with ASV Dronten in the summer of 2016 from Zwolle, and after a successful season signed with the Belgian club K.V. Kortrijk. Budde made his debut for Kortrijk in a 0–2 Belgian First Division A loss to KV Mechelen on 4 November 2017, wherein he scored an own goal.

References

External links
 
 Sport.Be Profile 
 Sport.De Profile

1997 births
Living people
Dutch footballers
K.V. Kortrijk players
Belgian Pro League players
Association football defenders
Dutch expatriate footballers
Dutch expatriate sportspeople in Belgium
Expatriate footballers in Belgium
Tweede Divisie players
SV TEC players
Footballers from Lelystad
Expatriate footballers in Andorra
Dutch expatriate sportspeople in Andorra
UE Engordany players
PEC Zwolle players